Huizhou Chinese, or the Hui dialect, is a group of closely related Sinitic languages spoken over a small area in and around the historical region of Huizhou (for which it is named), in about ten or so mountainous counties in southern Anhui, plus a few more in neighbouring Zhejiang and Jiangxi.

Although the Hui area is small compared with other Chinese dialect groups, it displays a very high degree of internal variation. Nearly every county has its own distinct dialect unintelligible to a speaker from a few counties away. For this reason, bilingualism and multilingualism are common among speakers of Hui. It is estimated that there are around 4.6 million speakers of Huizhou varieties.

Classification 
Huizhou Chinese was originally classified as Lower Yangtze Mandarin but it is currently classified separately from it.
The Chinese Academy of Social Sciences supported the separation of Huizhou from Lower Yangtze Mandarin in 1987. Its classification is disputed, with some linguists such as Matisoff classifying it as Wu Chinese, others such as Bradley (2007) as Gan, and still others setting it apart as a primary branch of Chinese.

History
During the Ming and Qing dynasties, Jianghuai speakers moved into Hui dialect areas.

Some works of literature produced in Yangzhou, such as Qingfengzha, a novel, contain Jianghuai Mandarin. People in Yangzhou identified by the dialect they speak, locals spoke the dialect, as opposed to sojourners, who spoke other varieties like Huizhou or Wu. This led to the formation of identity based on one's dialect. Large numbers of merchants from Huizhou lived in Yangzhou and effectively were responsible for keeping the town afloat. Merchants in the later imperial period also sponsored operas and performances in the Hui dialect.

Languages and dialects
Zhengzhang Shangfang divided the Hui languages into five subgroups, which are also used in the Language Atlas of China:

Ji–She
spoken in Jixi, She County, Huizhou, Jingde (Hongchuan area in the west), and Ningguo (Hongmen area in the south), Anhui province, as well as Chun'an (Tangcun in the west, etc.), Zhejiang province.
carries notable Wu influence. Jixihua is the main Ji-She variety.
Xiu–Yi
spoken in Tunxi, Taiping (Guocun in the southwest), Xiuning, Yi County, and Qimen (around Fufeng in the southeast), as well as Wuyuan, Jiangxi province.
Tunxihua is the main Xiu-Yi variety.
Qi–De
spoken in Qimen and Dongzhi (partially), Anhui province, as well as Fuliang, Dexing, and Wuyuan, Jiangxi province.
greatly influenced by the surrounding Gan languages. 
Yanzhou
spoken in Chun'an and Jiande (formerly Yanzhou Prefecture), Zhejiang province.
heavily influenced by Wu.
Jing–Zhan
spoken in Jingde, Qimen (in and around Anling, Chengan, and Chiling), Shitai (Zhanda area), Yi County (Meixi, Kecun, and other northern towns), and Ningguo, Anhui province.
forms a thin corridor along the northern edge of the Hui group, carrying influence from Xuanzhou Wu.

Huizhou varieties differ from township to township. People in different townships, towns, etc. (even in one county) often cannot speak with one another.

Features

Phonologically speaking, Hui is noted for its massive loss of syllable codas, including -i, -u, and nasals:

Many Hui dialects have diphthongs with a higher lengthened first part. A few areas take this to extremes.

Because nasal codas have mostly been lost, Hui reuses the   ending as a diminutive.

References

External links

 Classification of Hui Dialects

Varieties of Chinese
Languages of China